Azizul Haque Choudhury is a Bangladesh Awami League politician and former Member of Parliament from Dinajpur-6.

Career
Choudhury was elected to Parliament in 2008 from Dinajpur-6 as a Bangladesh Awami League candidate. In 2009, he was criticized by local officials for using his influence to appoint fertilizer traders.

References

Awami League politicians
Living people
9th Jatiya Sangsad members
Year of birth missing (living people)